ELCOT IT Park Trichy is an information technology (IT) park in the city of Tiruchirappalli, India. It was set up in 2010 as part of an effort to foster the growth of information technology in various cities of Tamil Nadu by Electronics Corporation of Tamil Nadu (ELCOT).

Location 

ELCOT IT Building 
The building offers complete power backup, a communication network, general maintenance, access control, fire safety, and ample parking space. Currently the entire floor space is occupied by various companies including, Vuram, V.Dart Technologies, GI Tech Gaming, and more, where 1535 employees are working, as listed below.

ELCOT IT Park

Out of which  falls under Special Economic Zone and the rest  are non-SEZ lands. Approval for SEZ is effective from 26 July 2007. The TNEB has been provided with 10 acres of land to set up a 110 kV substation.

Expansion
Due to an overwhelming response and requests from various stakeholders for more building space since the existing one has been completely occupied, Tamil Nadu Government has decided to construct one more IT Building next to the existing one. The civil work was started in December 2020 and is estimated to be completed in 18 months.

References

Economy of Tiruchirappalli
Science parks in India
Software technology parks in India
Science and technology in Tamil Nadu